The Desi Arnaz Stakes is an American Thoroughbred horse race run at Del Mar Racetrack in Del Mar, California. It was named in honor of the actor, musician, bandleader, comedian and producer, Desi Arnaz. It was originally run as the Moccasin Stakes at Hollywood Park Racetrack in Inglewood, California to honor Moccasin, the only two-year-old filly to be named American Horse of the Year. From 1995 through 1997 the race was run as the Maker's Mark Stakes then reverted to the Moccasin Stakes through 2013. Ownership of the race name was acquired at the end of 2013 when Hollywood Park ceased operations. It was first run at Del Mar in 2014 as the Desi Arnaz Stakes.

Always a race on dirt for two-year-old fillies, the ungraded event is set for the fall of each year. It is currently contested over a distance of six and one-half furlongs and currently offers a purse of $100,000.

Records
Speed record:
 1:16.20 @ current  furlongs: Ifyoucouldseemenow (1990)
 1:21.38 @ 7 furlongs: Spring Awakening (2007)

Most wins by a jockey:
 3 - Alex Solis (1991, 1996, 1999)
 3 - Drayden Van Dyke (2014, 2017, 2018)

Most wins by a trainer:
 4 - Bob Baffert (2003, 2004, 2017, 2018)

Most wins by an owner:
 2 - Jan, Mace & Samantha Siegel (1990, 1994)

Winners

References

Horse races in California
Flat horse races for two-year-old fillies
Recurring sporting events established in 1980
Del Mar Racetrack
Hollywood Park Racetrack